Miisiirii (also called Mileri or Jabal) is a language of western Sudan, spoken by the Mileri community of Jebel Mun (Jebel Moon) in Darfur who claim a dubious Messiria Arab descent,  they also have a few speakers scattered in Chad.

Milerinkiya belongs to the Taman language family. It is often considered a dialect of Tama, though it is not particularly close.

References

Taman languages
Languages of Chad
Languages of Sudan